National Union of Independents may refer to:

National Union of Independents (Monaco)
National Union of Independents (Upper Volta)